Z23 may refer to:
 Z23 (computer), a computer built by Konrad Zuse in 1961
 German destroyer Z23, a destroyer built for the Kriegsmarine in the late 1930s